Ingeborg Busch (born 26 December 1943) is a German diver. She competed in the women's 10 metre platform event at the 1968 Summer Olympics.

References

1943 births
Living people
German female divers
Olympic divers of West Germany
Divers at the 1968 Summer Olympics
Sportspeople from Heidelberg